Van Sam is a surname. Notable people with the surname include:

Guy Van Sam (born 1935), French footballer
Lai Van Sam (born 1957), Vietnamese journalist

Surnames of Dutch origin